Fātemeh Vā'ezi (born March 16, 1950, in Tonekabon, Iran), better known as Parisā, is a Persian classical singer, Avaz master, and one of the foremost female vocalists from Iran.

Early life and musical training 

After finishing high school, with an emphasis on Persian literature, she started her musical work under the supervision of the renowned Persian Radif teacher, Mahmoud Karimi, a highly respected teacher of classical Persian music whose vast knowledge of the ancient repertoire was fundamental to her career.

Karimi once commented: "Parisa is my most promising pupil and she can sing all the modes with the skill of re-interpretation or improvisation necessary to correctly perform Iranian music".

Career 
In the early 1970s, Parisa was training intensely with vocal master Mahmud Karimi at the Honarestan-e Musiqi-ye Meli (National Music Academy) and occasionally performed at the Ministry of Culture's Rudaki Hall. Fulbright scholar of Iranian music Lloyd Miller was also studying with master Karimi in the men's vocal class at the Music Academy. One day master Karimi invited Miller to visit the women's class and Miller was stunned by Parisa's excellent vocal skills and decided to do everything possible to help her rise to the top of the Tehran music scene. As a music writer in most publications in Tehran, Miller began to continually praise everything about Parisa, while he was also writing relatively negative reviews about some of the westernized pop-oriented concerts presented by the Ministry of Culture at Rudaki Hall. Miller was PR person for the Center for Preservation and Propagation of Iranian Music, directed by grand master Daryush Safvat.

Since Parisa was funded by a scholarship from the Ministry of Culture, she could not be a member of the NIRT Center until she worked off her scholarship by performing for the Ministry. Miller was saddened by this situation but one day was invited to Rudaki Hall for a meeting with an official from the Ministry. At the meeting Miller was asked what it would take for him to stop writing scathing negative articles about the Ministry for their "inappropriate modern and pop music efforts". According to him, if the Ministry would "allow Parisa to join the Center's cadre of rising young masers of totally traditional music," he would "only write about the good concerts at the Ministry like western classical music or other harmless efforts." The next day when Miller went to the Center he was shocked to see Parisa sitting waiting for an interview with master Safvat. She was consequently immediately accepted and began her career as one of Iran's foremost vocalists.

Meanwhile, Miller had applied to be the A and R person for CBS Iran but was rejected in favor of Marsel, a popular modernized piano personality. Miller was told he was rejected because he had an agenda and couldn't be fair in his music selections. Miller was not discouraged and at a party soon after he befriended the Marsel and enticed him to come to Dr. Safvat's Center to hear the most amazing vocalist and instrumentalists in the whole country. Marsel was immediately converted to Parisa and soon produced three cassette tapes which hit the top of the music charts in Tehran. Parisa and the Center's musicians offered many concerts in Iran and also at the famed annual Shiraz Art Festival. She also performed at festivals in Europe and Japan.

After the 1979 revolution, Parisa was no longer allowed to perform in public although she should have been the one lady vocalist who would have been accepted except that other less appropriate singers would try to get back their claim to fame. So she devoted herself to her family and giving private lessons.

In 1980, she was again invited to teach traditional Persian music at the Center, which she continued to do until 1995. Since then, she has performed at music festivals and major concert halls throughout the world with many prominent groups and musicians, including Dastan Ensemble, Dariush Tala'i, and Hossein Omoumi.

Parisa currently lives in Tehran, Iran.

Concerts and tours 
Although still based in Iran, for the last 20 years she has been able to tour widely performing Persian and Sufi music in Europe and the US and has recorded several albums to date. Here is a list of her activities up to 2012:

See also 
 Iranian music
 Persian traditional music
 List of Iranian women
 Shiraz Arts Festival

References

 Music and Song in Persia, Curzon Press 1999 and The Center for Preservation and Propagation of Iranian Music, Society for Preservation and Propagation of Eastern Arts, (affiliated with National Iranian Radio & Television) Salt Lake City, 1977.

External links
 Official website
 Parissa and the Dastan Ensemble Concert, parstimes.com
 
 Tasnif-e Dashti sung by Parisa
 Parisa auf culturebase.net

1950 births
Living people
Iranian musicians
Iranian folk singers
People from Tonekabon
Iranian women singers
Iranian classical singers
20th-century Iranian women singers